Edward Elson may refer to:
 Edward L. R. Elson, Presbyterian minister and Chaplain of the United States Senate
 Edward Elliot Elson, American ambassador